Natalie Taylor may refer to:

 Natalie Taylor (basketball) (born 1982), New Zealand basketball player
 Natalie Taylor (singer), American singer-songwriter